Alfyorovo is a rural locality (a village) in Muromtsevskoye Rural Settlement, Sudogodsky District, Vladimir Oblast, Russia. The population was 11 as of 2010.

Geography 
It is located 10 km south from Muromtsevo, 13 km south from Sudogda.

References 

Rural localities in Sudogodsky District